This is a list of films released in the 1950s produced in Armenia SSR or directed by Armenians or about Armenia or Armenians, ordered by year of release.

External links

 Website of the Armenian Association of Film Critics and Cinema Journalists
 Armenian films at the Internet Movie Database
 List of Armenfilm productions at the Internet Movie Database

See also
 Armenfilm, a production unit of the Soviet State Cinema Organisation 
 List of Soviet films

1950
Arm
Films